Roepera billardierei, synonym Zygophyllum billardierei, commonly known as coast twin-leaf, is a species of plant in the family Zygophyllaceae found in temperate regions of Australia.  In Tasmania, where it has only been recorded from the Furneaux Group in Bass Strait, it is listed as Rare under the state's Threatened Species Protection Act 1995.

Description
Coast twin-leaf is a perennial herb with stems that spread over the ground.  The stems are branched and 20–40 mm long.  The leaves are Y-shaped, with blunt tips, and up to 15 mm long.  The flowers are yellow and about 10 mm long. The fruit is a drooping four-angled capsule about 10–12 mm long, containing brown seeds.  It is a scrambling plant which is found in both sheltered and exposed coastal sites where it stabilises loose sand on dunes.

References

Zygophylloideae
Flora of Victoria (Australia)
Flora of Tasmania
Flora of New South Wales
Flora of South Australia
Flora of Western Australia